Peter Micheler is a former West German-Luxembourgish slalom canoeist who competed from the late 1970s to the early 1990s.

He won two medals in the K-1 event at the ICF Canoe Slalom World Championships with a silver in 1985 and a bronze in 1983. He also won a gold (1985) and a silver (1983) in the K-1 team event at the World Championships.

Since 1990 Micheler represented Luxembourg.

World Cup individual podiums

References
Overview of athlete's results at canoeslalom.net 

German male canoeists
Living people
Year of birth missing (living people)
Medalists at the ICF Canoe Slalom World Championships